"Connection" is a song by American pop rock band OneRepublic. The song was released as a single via digital download on June 26, 2018. It was written by band members Ryan Tedder, Brent Kutzle, as well as Zach Skelton, Noel Zancanella and Jacob Kasher.

Commercial performance
"Connection" sold 32,000 digital copies in its first week and debuted on the Billboard Digital Songs Sales chart at number 23. The song was also streamed for over 10.8 million times and peaked at number twenty-one on the Billboard Bubbling Under Hot 100 chart.

Music video
The official music video of the song was released on August 28, 2018, through Vevo. As of October 1, 2022, the video has achieved over 24 million views.

The video's setting is within the Oculus New York's World Trade Center station, with Ryan Tedder wandering around looking for a 'connection' to end his loneliness. Various extras dressed in business attire are shown staring at the palms of their hands (like a phone screen) as an interpretive dancer performs. A brief cutscene shows him driving a Jeep Cherokee through Manhattan.

A majority of the video is shot in black and white except for the last chorus, where the whole band is performing and the station is illuminated by purple lightning. The video was directed by Joel Pront.

Usage in media
"Connection" appeared in Jeep's "2018 Summer of Jeep: Sold Out" commercial. The appearance led the song to top the Billboard Top Commercial Songs chart in July 2018.

It is part of the R.B.I. Baseball 19 soundtrack.

It also appears in the trailer and the opening scene for the 2019 movie Jexi.

Track listing

Charts

Weekly charts

Monthly charts

Year-end charts

Certifications

Release history

References

2018 singles
2018 songs
American hip hop songs
OneRepublic songs
Songs written by Ryan Tedder
Songs written by Brent Kutzle
Interscope Records singles
Songs written by Noel Zancanella
Songs written by Jacob Kasher
Songs written by Zach Skelton